Trethosa is a hamlet in the parish of St Stephen in Brannel, Cornwall, England, United Kingdom. To the north is Trethosa China Clay Works.  Poet Jack Clemo was a parishioner of the local chapel.

References

Hamlets in Cornwall